The Roman theatre at St Albans, Hertfordshire, England is an excavated site within the Roman walled city of Verulamium. Although there are other Roman theatres in Britain (for example at Camulodunum), the one at Verulamium is claimed to be the only example of its kind, being a theatre with a stage rather than an amphitheatre.

The theatre differs from the typical Roman theatre in being built on a site that is only slightly sloping, and in its plan (although there are theatres with similar plans in Northern Gaul).

The theatre was built in about 140AD. Urban life continued in Verulamium into the 5th century. However, by that time the theatre had fallen into disuse.  It was used as a rubbish dump in the 4th century.
It was excavated in the 19th century, and again in the 1930s by Kathleen Kenyon.

Access and use
The theatre is on land belonging to the Earl of Verulam and is regularly opened to the public.

It is sometimes used for theatrical performances.

See also
 Roman theatre (structure)
 St Albans Museums

References

2nd-century establishments in Roman Britain
Outdoor theatres
Roman St Albans
Theatres in Hertfordshire
Theatres in Roman Britain
Roman sites in Hertfordshire